Atlético de Madrid firmly re-established itself in La Liga, thanks to a seventh-place finish. The season saw Fernando Torres taking another step towards superstardom, scoring 19 goals in the season during which he turned 20 years, which led to a call-up to the Spain national team for UEFA Euro 2004. The finish was still not enough to satisfy the owner family Gil, resulting in coach Gregorio Manzano unexpectedly getting the sack.

Squad

Goalkeepers
 Germán Burgos
  Sergio Aragoneses
  Juanma
  Ismael Falcón

Defenders
  Cosmin Contra
  García Calvo
  Santi
  Sergi
  Matías Lequi
  Gaspar Gálvez
  Iván Romero

Midfielders
  Gonzalo de los Santos
  Kiki Musampa
  Jorge Larena
  Rubén Olivera
  Diego Simeone
  Carlos Aguilera
  Nano
  Ariel Ibagaza
  Rodrigo Fabri
  Álvaro Novo
  Diego Rivas
  Juanma Ortiz
  Gabi

Attackers
  Fernando Torres
  Veljko Paunović
  Demis Nikolaidis
  Toché
  Arizmendi

Competitions

La Liga

League table

Sevilla–Atlético Madrid 1-0
 1-0 Júlio Baptista 
Atlético Madrid–Albacete 1-0
 1-0 Jorge Larena 
Osasuna–Atlético Madrid 1-0
 1-0 Pablo García 
Atlético Madrid–Valencia 0-3
 0-1 Vicente 
 0-2 Mista 
 0-3 Mista 
Atlético Madrid–Barcelona 0-0
Deportivo–Atlético Madrid 5-1
 1-0 Fran 
 1-1 Matías Lequi 
 2-1 Enrique Romero 
 3-1 Sergio 
 4-1 Walter Pandiani 
 5-1 Lionel Scaloni 
Atlético Madrid–Mallorca 2-1
 1-0 Fernando Torres 
 1-1 Samuel Eto'o 
 2-1 Jorge Larena 
Real Murcia–Atlético Madrid 1-3
 0-1 Fernando Torres 
 0-2 Demis Nikolaidis 
 1-2 David Karanka 
 1-3 Fernando Torres 
Atlético Madrid–Real Sociedad 4-0
 1-0 Demis Nikolaidis 
 2-0 Fernando Torres 
 3-0 Fernando Torres 
 4-0 Diego Simeone 
Betis–Atlético Madrid 1-2
 1-0 Marcos Assunção 
 1-1 Fernando Torres 
 1-2 Fernando Torres 
Atlético Madrid–Villarreal 1-0
 1-0 Álvaro Novo 
Valladolid–Atlético Madrid 3-1
 0-1 Kiki Musampa 
 1-1 Ariza Makukula 
 2-1 Víctor Zapata 
 3-1 Francisco Sousa 
Atlético Madrid–Málaga 2-0
 1-0 Gonzalo de los Santos 
 2-0 Demis Nikolaidis 
Real Madrid–Atlético Madrid 2-0
 1-0 Ronaldo 
 2-0 Raúl 
Atlético Madrid–Espanyol 2-0
 1-0 Fernando Torres 
 2-0 Fernando Torres 
Celta Vigo–Atlético Madrid 2-2
 0-1 Diego Simeone 
 1-1 Peter Luccin 
 2-1 Savo Milošević 
 2-2 Matías Lequi 
Atlético Madrid–Racing Santander 2-2
 0-1 Sergio Matabuena 
 1-1 Veljko Paunović 
 2-1 Kiki Musampa 
 2-2 Jonatan Valle 
Real Zaragoza–Atlético Madrid 0-0
Atlético Madrid–Athletic Bilbao 3-0
 1-0 Fernando Torres 
 2-0 Fernando Torres 
 3-0 Veljko Paunović 
Atlético Madrid–Sevilla 2-1
 1-0 Fernando Torres 
 2-0 Demis Nikolaidis 
 2-1 José Antonio Reyes 
Albacete–Atlético Madrid 1-1
 0-1 Nano 
 1-1 Matías Lequi 
Atlético Madrid–Osasuna 1-1
 0-1 Valdo 
 1-1 Demis Nikolaidis 
Valencia–Atlético Madrid 3-0
 1-0 Mista 
 2-0 Vicente 
 3-0 Mista 
Barcelona–Atlético Madrid 3-1
 1-0 Javier Saviola 
 1-1 Demis Nikolaidis 
 2-1 Ronaldinho 
 3-1 Luis García Sanz 
Atlético Madrid–Deportivo 0-0
Mallorca–Atlético Madrid 0-1
 0-1 Fernando Torres 
Atlético Madrid–Real Murcia 1-1
 0-1 Luis García Fernández 
 1-1 Nano 
Real Sociedad–Atlético Madrid 2-1
 1-0 Valeri Karpin 
 2-0 Diego Simeone 
 2-1 Veljko Paunović 
Atlético Madrid–Betis 2-1
 1-0 Veljko Paunović 
 1-1 Joaquín 
 2-1 Fernando Torres 
Villarreal–Atlético Madrid 0-0
Atlético Madrid–Valladolid 2-1
 1-0 Fernando Torres 
 2-0 Veljko Paunović 
 2-1 Pablo Richetti 
Málaga–Atlético Madrid 3-1
 1-0 Ivan Leko 
 2-0 Diego Alonso 
 2-1 Nano 
 3-1 Diego Alonso 
Atlético Madrid–Real Madrid 1-2
 0-1 Santiago Solari 
 1-1 Veljko Paunović 
 1-2 Iván Helguera 
Espanyol–Atlético Madrid 3-1
 1-0 Fredson 
 2-0 Claudiu Răducanu 
 3-0 Claudiu Răducanu 
 3-1 Fernando Torres 
Atlético Madrid–Celta Vigo 3-2
 1-0 Nano 
 2-0 Fernando Torres 
 2-1 Savo Milošević 
 3-1 García Calvo 
 3-2 Edu 
Racing Santander–Atlético Madrid 2-2
 0-1 Ariel Ibagaza 
 1-1 Cristian Álvarez 
 1-2 Gonzalo de los Santos 
 2-2 Omri Afek 
Atlético Madrid–Real Zaragoza 1-2
 1-0 Nano 
 1-1 Delio Toledo 
 1-2 Delio Toledo 
Athletic Bilbao–Atlético Madrid 3-4
 1-0 Andoni Iraola 
 1-1 Ariel Ibagaza 
 1-2 Gonzalo de los Santos 
 1-3 Fernando Torres 
 2-3 Joseba Arriaga 
 2-4 Fernando Torres 
 3-4 Joseba Arriaga

Top scorers

La Liga
  Fernando Torres 19
  Veljko Paunović 6
  Demis Nikolaidis 6
  Nano 5

Atlético Madrid seasons
Atlético Madrid